Road Songs for Lovers is the twenty-fourth studio album by British singer-songwriter Chris Rea, released on 29 September 2017 by Jazzee Blue and BMG labels.

Background
Rea stated there was no initial intention to make a new album, but after a bad medical condition in 2016 he started to write new songs which eventually led to a band regroup, and first album release in six years. A semi-concept album, the songs were inspired by traveling on the road to London, seeing couples in cars and questioning the "people's love stories inside cars". According to Rea, most of the songs are about a boy-girl relationship in the car. He has stated that his favorite song is "Last Train", the lyrics of which are not about the typical meaning of the last train which goes home, but taking the last train in a desperate situation without knowing anything about its direction.

Release
The album was released on a double gatefold vinyl LP, and CD edition featuring 12-page booklet. Prior to the album release the song "The Road Ahead" was released on 29 July 2017 as a single for digital download and streaming.

Tour
The album release was followed by a European tour with 37 dates which started in October until December, 2017. During the tour he had to have daily three hours long therapy for nerves in his right hand. On 9 December, Rea collapsed during a performance at the New Theatre Oxford, the 35th concert of the tour. He was taken to hospital, with his condition stabilised, and the last two concerts canceled.

Reception
Doug Collette, in a review for All About Jazz, gave the album 4/5 stars, concluding that "the sonics of this album, as applied to the tantalizing guitar solo of 'Last Train' and throughout the album, are a reassuring blend of succor and salve for body, mind and soul". Aaron Badgley for The Spill Magazine also gave it 4/5 rating, praising the album for its blend of blues and rock, stating that "young artists would do well to study this one, it really could be a blueprint for how a good rock album should sound".

Andrew W. Griffin rated it 4.5/5, considered "Last Train" to be "delivered in gothic, world-weary style that brings to mind Bob Dylan or Tom Waits or Nick Cave" and praised the engineers, Alex Robinson and Tim Young, mastering. Hugh Fielder writing for Louder Sound commented, "As the title suggests, Rea is on familiar ground once again, but his fans won’t be complaining. After all, the scenery on any road trip is an endless vista of observations and speculations, and Rea’s lyrics can evoke both with consummate ease, drawing you closer as the album progresses. The musical class on this record is, of course, a given."

Hugh Fielder from TeamRock gave it 3.5/5 stars and stated that "fans won't be complaining. After all, the scenery on any road trip is an endless vista of observations and speculations, and Rea's lyrics can evoke both with consummate ease, drawing you closer as the album progresses". Giuliano Benassi for laut.de gave a score of 3/5 and concluded it gives "easy listening for intense concert evenings" and that Rea "still does not lack musical ideas".

Track listing

Personnel 
 Chris Rea – vocals, guitars 
 Robert Ahwai – rhythm guitars 
 Neil Drinkwater – keyboards 
 James Ahwai – bass 
 Martin Ditcham – drums

Production 
 Producer, Cover (Collage) – Chris Rea
 Engineer and Mixing – Alex Robinson
 Mastering – Tim Young
 Art Direction and Design – Melanie Fordyce and Stuart Crouch Creative
 Photography – Adam Cowe

Charts

References

2017 albums
Blues albums by English artists
Chris Rea albums